The 1994 Open Championship was a men's major golf championship and the 123rd Open Championship, held from 14 to 17 July at Turnberry Golf Resort, Scotland. Nick Price won the second of his three major championships and only Claret Jug, one stroke ahead of runner-up Jesper Parnevik.

Price was three-under over the final three holes and posted 66 (–4), while Parnevik, in the group ahead, bogeyed the 72nd hole to miss a  It was the first of two consecutive majors for Price, who won his second PGA Championship a month later.

Course

Ailsa Course 

^ The 18th hole was renamed "Duel in the Sun" in 2003.

Previous lengths of the course for The Open Championship:
  
 1986: , par 70
 1977: , par 70

Past champions in the field

Made the cut

Source:

Missed the cut

Source:

Round summaries

First round
Thursday, 14 July 1994

Source:

Second round
Friday, 15 July 1994

Source:
Amateurs: Bennett (–1), James (+5), Evans (+9), Harris (+9), Pullan (+15)

Third round
Saturday, 16 July 1994

Source:

Final round
Sunday, 17 July 1994

Source:
Amateurs: Bennett (+6)

Scorecard

Cumulative tournament scores, relative to par

Source:

References

External links
Turnberry 1994 (Official site)
123rd Open championship - Turnberry (European Tour)

The Open Championship
Golf tournaments in Scotland
Open Championship
Open Championship
Open Championship